Iratxe García Pérez (born 7 October 1974) is a Spanish politician of the Spanish Socialist Workers' Party (PSOE). She has served as Member of the European Parliament since 2004, and has served as the Leader of the Progressive Alliance of Socialists and Democrats parliamentary group since 2019.

Biography

Early life 
Born on 7 October 1974 in Barakaldo, Biscay, she obtained a diplomature in Social Work at the University of Valladolid in 1995. A resident of Laguna de Duero, she served as municipal councillor of Laguna de Duero and as member of the Valladolid Provincial Deputation from 1995 to 2000.

Member of the Spanish Parliament, 2000–2004
García became a member of the Congress of Deputies after being elected in the 2000 general election in representation of Valladolid.

Member of the European Parliament, 2004–present
In her first parliamentary term between 2004 and 2009, García served on the Committee on Regional Development (REGI), the Delegation to the Euro-Mediterranean Parliamentary Assembly (EMPA), and the Delegation for Relations with the Maghreb countries and the Arab Maghreb Union (including Libya).

She also serves on the Committee on the Environment, Public Health and Food Safety (ENVI) and the Parliament's Delegation for Relations with the Arab Peninsula. In addition, she is a member of the European Parliament Intergroup on LGBT Rights and of the European Parliament Intergroup on the Western Sahara.

In July 2014, García was elected chairwoman of the European Parliament Committee on Women's Rights and Gender Equality (FEMM). In September 2014, PSOE chairman Pedro Sánchez appointed her as head of the party's delegation of MEPs in the S&D Group, replacing Elena Valenciano. Following the 2019 elections, the S&D Group chose García as new leader, a day after incumbent Udo Bullmann withdrew his candidacy. In March 2021, as leader of the Democrats and Socialist in the EP, she together with the parliamentary group opposed a debate on the murder of Daphne Caruana Galizia and corruption revelation in Maltese politics; she insisted on calling it "fake news".

References

External link

1974 births
Living people
Spanish municipal councillors
Members of the 7th Congress of Deputies (Spain)
MEPs for Spain 2004–2009
MEPs for Spain 2009–2014
MEPs for Spain 2014–2019
MEPs for Spain 2019–2024
21st-century women MEPs for Spain
People from Barakaldo
Spanish Socialist Workers' Party MEPs
Basque women in politics
University of Valladolid alumni
20th-century Spanish women